The Jeffersonville, Madison and Indianapolis Railroad (JM&I) was formed in 1866 as a merger between the Indianapolis and Madison Railroad and the Jeffersonville Railroad.

Genealogy

The JM&I predecessors were as follows:
Jeffersonville, Madison and Indianapolis Railroad
Indianapolis and Madison Railroad 1866
Madison and Indianapolis Railroad 1862
 Madison, Indianapolis & Lafayette Railroad 1843
Jeffersonville Railroad 1866
Ohio and Indianapolis Railway 1849
Knightstown & Shelbyville Railroad 1852 (abandoned 1868)
Shelbyville Lateral Railroad 1851 (abandoned 1867)
Shelby and Rush Railroad 1882
Rushville and Shelbyville Railroad 1859
Columbus and Shelby Railroad 1881
Lake Erie and Louisville Railroad 1890
Lake Erie and Pacific Railroad 1865
Fremont, Lima & Union Railroad 1865
The Fremont and Indiana Railroad 1861

History
The Ohio and Indianapolis Railroad was chartered February 3, 1832, to build a line from Indianapolis south to the Ohio River at Jeffersonville, Indiana. The company was not organized until March 17, 1848, and on February 3, 1849, it was renamed the Jeffersonville Railroad.

The first section, from Jeffersonville to just north of Memphis, Indiana, opened in 1850. The next year it leased the Knightstown and Shelbyville Railroad, starting to operate it in 1852. The line opened north to Columbus in August 1852, and on September 1, 1852, it began operating the Rushville and Shelbyville Railroad under lease.

On January 27, 1836, an act of the Indiana General Assembly established Indiana's first railroad to actually be built. Construction began on the state-owned Madison and Indianapolis Railroad on September 16, 1836. After building only  from Madison to Queensville (just northwest of North Vernon in Jennings County) by 1841, the railroad was transferred to private ownership on June 20, 1842, as the Madison and Indianapolis Railroad Company. Although it was successful for more than a decade, it went into decline, was sold at foreclosure on March 27, 1862, and renamed the Indianapolis and Madison Railroad (I&M). The successor company abandoned the M&I's  of trackage between Columbus and Edinburgh in 1864 and began running over the Jeffersonville Railroad's nearby tracks.

Organized on April 30, 1866, for the purpose of uniting the two lines, the Jeffersonville, Madison and Indianapolis Railroad Company (JM&I) absorbed the Indianapolis & Madison the next day, with the Jeffersonville Railroad being officially merged in on June 1 of that same year, upon the filing of the Articles of Consolidation.

On May 22, 1868, the Reno Gang held up the JM&I Railroad train at Marshfield, Scott County, Indiana, and escaped with $90,000 in cash described as being in "new notes." The money was never officially recovered and in today's value, represented more than $2 million.

The Scottsburg Depot opened in 1872. It was placed on the National Register of Historic Places in 1991.

See also
List of bridges documented by the Historic American Engineering Record in Indiana

References

Railroad History Database
PRR Chronology 
Corporate Genealogy - Pittsburgh, Cincinnati, Chicago and St. Louis Railway

External links

Jeffersonville, Madison and Indianapolis Railroad collection, Rare Books and Manuscripts, Indiana State Library

Defunct Indiana railroads
Companies affiliated with the Pittsburgh, Cincinnati, Chicago and St. Louis Railroad
Defunct companies based in Indianapolis
Historic American Engineering Record in Indiana
Transportation in Indianapolis
Train robberies
Predecessors of the Pennsylvania Railroad
Railway companies established in 1866
Railway companies disestablished in 1890
Robberies in the United States
Crimes in Indiana
1866 establishments in Indiana